Callum Luke Saunders (born 26 September 1995) is a professional footballer who plays as a forward for  club Stafford Rangers. Born in Turkey, he represented Wales internationally at youth levels U19 and 21.

Club career
Saunders began his career in the Crewe Alexandra Academy and signed a professional contract with the club in June 2014. He made his Football League debut on 9 August 2014 in a 2–1 defeat away at Fleetwood Town, and scored his first Crewe goal at Doncaster on 12 December 2015. On 9 May 2017, Crewe announced that Saunders had been released by the club.

He then signed for Notts County at the beginning of the 2017–18 season but was released at the end of the season.

Saunders signed for Northern Premier League side Nantwich Town on the eve of the 2018–19 season, scoring 10 goals in 36 games, before joining Curzon Ashton in the summer of 2019. He then returned to Nantwich Town in November 2019. 

He signed for Northern Premier League Premier League side Witton Albion on a free transfer in September 2021.

Saunders signed for Ashton United in June 2022. On 19 December 2022, Saunders left Ashton United by mutual consent and joined Stafford Rangers.

International career
Saunders has represented Wales at under-17 and under-19 level, and made his under-21 debut on 17 November 2015, coming on as an 87th-minute substitute against Romania.

Personal life
Saunders was born in Istanbul when his father, former professional footballer Dean Saunders, was playing for the Turkish club Galatasaray.

Career statistics

References

External links

1995 births
Living people
Welsh footballers
Association football forwards
Welsh people of English descent
Footballers from Istanbul
Crewe Alexandra F.C. players
Notts County F.C. players
Nantwich Town F.C. players
Curzon Ashton F.C. players
Witton Albion F.C. players
Ashton United F.C. players
Stafford Rangers F.C. players
English Football League players
National League (English football) players
Northern Premier League players
Wales youth international footballers
Wales under-21 international footballers